Usia is a village in Kamsaar, Uttar Pradesh, India. It lies southeast of Ghazipur and east of Dildarnagar, close to the Bihar State border.USIA is a historical village of ghazipur as well as uttar pradesh, it was founded by  1. Barbal khan 2. Dada jahangir khan. Barbal khane stablished half of village is called north side of village . Jahangir Khan  established half of village is known as south side and he also established another village is called Khajuri that's lies on bank of Karamnaasa river most of the population of village is Muslim as well as hindu and other community who lives together and happily . Deupty syed Ahmed Khan founder of Skbm  , famous Bollywood actor and indian freedom fighter Nazir Hussain and from bazar muhalla railway grd. Dawood Hussain Khan who was also a one of founding fathers of skbm are famous personalities from village .

Most of the inhabitants live in an area of 378 acres. The village is home to 25,000 people, made up of 13,000 men and 12,000 women. The population increased by 21.4% from 1991 - 2001. Scheduled castes comprise 83% of the population. The literacy rate is 83% among men and 63% among women. The land spread of Usia is almost 26 km² in Ghazipur District. Almost 8500 Kamsaar Pathans lived in the village as of 2011 Census.

Nazir Hussain was from Usia.

Historical population

References

External links 

Towns and villages in Kamsar
Villages in Ghazipur district